Eucereon cimonis is a moth of the subfamily Arctiinae. It was described by Schaus in 1910. It is found in Costa Rica, Venezuela, Ecuador and Peru.

References

cimonis
Moths described in 1910